Mayr's forest rail (Rallicula mayri) is a species of bird in the family Sarothruridae.
It is found in northern New Guinea.

References

Rallicula
Birds described in 1930
Taxonomy articles created by Polbot